The 8th local elections were held in South Korea on 1 June 2022. These elections came after the presidential election in March 2022, and coincided with the by-elections for the vacant seats in the National Assembly. It was the first nationwide election under President Yoon Suk-yeol after taking office on 10 May.

President Yoon Suk-yeol's party, the People Power Party, decisively won the local elections. The 50.9% turnout is the lowest since 2002.

Process 
Citizens born before 2 June 2004 had the right to vote and the right to be elected.

Previous seat composition

Metropolitan city mayors

Seoul

Graphical summary

Results

Busan

Results

Daegu

Results

Incheon

Graphical summary

Results

Gwangju

Results

Daejeon

Graphical summary

Results

Ulsan

Results

Sejong

Graphical summary

Results

Provincial governors

Gyeonggi

Graphical summary

Polling average

Results

Gangwon

Graphical summary

Results

North Chungcheong

Graphical summary

Results

South Chungcheong

Graphical summary

Polling average

Results

North Jeolla

Results

South Jeolla

Results

North Gyeongsang

Results

South Gyeongsang

Results

Jeju

Results

District, city and county mayors

Metropolitan city and provincial councilors

Constituency seats

Proportional representation seats

Total seats

District, city and county councilors

References

External links
2022 Local Government (Provincial) Election in South Korea. The Financial News.

2022 elections in South Korea
Local elections in South Korea
June 2022 events in South Korea